Teddy was a Norwegian brand of cigarettes, owned by the multinational company British American Tobacco. Cigarettes were manufactured by the Norwegian subsidiary of BAT (formerly "Dr. J. L. Tiedemanns Tobaksfabrik").

History
There was a tobacco war going on nearly 100 years ago, and it arrived Norway soon after the British-American Tobacco Co., (Norway) Ltd. was established in Oslo in 1905. It rapidly became a cruel war between the American tobacco trust (led by American Tobacco Company's James 'Buck' Duke) and the Norwegian manufacturers. In the United States president Theodore 'Teddy' Roosevelt was fighting the American trust/enterprise, and he soon became a rather hero of sorts for the Norwegian manufacturers. In 1914 J. L. Tiedemanns Tobaksfabrik honored Roosevelt by launching a cigarette brand named Teddy. The trust war in Norway ended in November/December 1930 when BAT (Norway) was split between BATCO (45%), Tiedemann (45%), DnC (5%) - a bank, Andresens Bank (5%) - a bank owned by the Andresen family, the real owners of J. L. Tiedemanns Tobaksfabrik, when A/S Norsk-Engelsk Tobakkfabrikk (NETO) was established. In November 1933 NETO was completely in the hands of J. L. Tiedemanns.

In a commercial shown on early Norwegian TV, Teddy was presented as a cigarette for sportsmen and physically active Norwegians.

Teddy was miles ahead of the nearest Norwegian brand on the market in age. Blue Master (a toasted brand also manufactured by J.L.T.) was launched in 1937, but Virginia cigarettes aren't as popular as they used to be in Norway, so it will take a miracle for Teddy to reach 100.

The brand was introduced in 1914 and the cigarettes use a Virginia tobacco. The brand was discontinued in 2010.

See also

 Tobacco smoking

References

British American Tobacco brands